Obit  may refer to:

Obituary, a news article reporting a person's death, and typically including his/her biography.
Obit (film), a 2016 documentary about the obituary writers at The New York Times
Obiit, a medieval mass of remembrance, named from the 3rd person singular perfect indicative active of the Latin verb ob-eo, to go away: "(s)he has gone away." Also refers to an anniversary of a death, on which such a mass was held.
"O.B.I.T.", a 1963 episode of the original The Outer Limits television show